Shamrao Vishnu Parulekar (born 5 October 1902)  was an Indian politician and leader of Communist Party of India. He represented Thane constituency in 2nd Lok Sabha.

He was member of the Servants of India Society (1928—40) and Workers' Delegate to the International Labour Conference held in Geneva in 1938. He was also member at  Bombay Legislative Assembly.

References

Communist Party of India politicians from Maharashtra
India MPs 1957–1962
1902 births
Year of death missing